Gran Plaza is an underground station of the Seville Metro on the line 1. It is located at the intersection of Eduardo Dato and Cruzcampo avenues, in the neighborhood of Nervión. Gran Plaza station is located by the Gran Plaza square, between the stations Nervión and 1º de Mayo on the same line. It was opened on 2 April 2009.

See also
 List of Seville metro stations

References

External links 
  Official site.
 History, construction details and maps.

Seville Metro stations
Railway stations in Spain opened in 2009